TGL, Inc. (Technical Group Laboratory, Inc.) (株式会社テイジイエル Kabushiki-gaisha Ti Ji Eru) is a Japanese company dealing with developing, constructing and planning of various computer systems and software. This company supports the operating systems: Java, C, C++, Oracle, asp, Linux, Unix, Windows NT.

Subsidiaries
(formerly  and ): It is TGL's video game development and publishing subsidiary. TGL Planning was founded on August 5, 1999 while TGL Sales was founded on December 14, 2005. The two merged to form Entergram on April 1, 2016.
: It consists of the game brands part of Entergram.
Giga - a brand used for adult titles.
Pink Clover - a brand used for BL titles.
: It is TGL's employment service subsidiary.
Technical Group Laboratory international (TGL國際): It is TGL's Korean subsidiary.

Former subsidiaries
Taiwan TGL Corporation (台灣帝技爺如科技股份有限公司): It is a video game publisher for Taiwan market. The company was founded in 2000 following 4 years of establishing TGL Taiwan branch. In 2002-10, Soft-World International Corporation increases its stake to Taiwan TGL Corporation to 72.46, making it the subsidiary of SWIC. In 2003, Taiwan TGL Corporation was reported to be merged into Game Flier International Corporation (遊戲新幹線), but the process of dissolving Taiwan TGL Corporation would only take place at the end of June 2009.

Games

TGL

Giga ports

Other Ports

Pink Clover

Entergram
Original games

Giga ports

Other ports

Licensed games

Staff
 Kazue Yamamoto

Character Designs
 Sasaki Ikuko (佐々木郁子) - Sengoku Bishoujo Emaki, Farland Odyssey series.
 Tomokazu Kazue
 Takahiro Kimura – Variable Geo series.

References

External links
The Official TGL website
TGL PLANNING INC. site
TGL SALES INC. site
TGL SALES INC. (Japan) video game portal
Entergram site
Taiwan TGL Corporation site
TGL CAREER PRODUCE site

 
Software companies of Japan
Video game companies of Japan
Video game publishers
Video game companies established in 1984
Japanese companies established in 1984